Michaël Llodra and Andy Ram were the defending champions, but Ram chose to participate at the St. Petersburg Open instead. Llodra partnered up with Marc Gicquel, but they lost in the quarterfinals against Simone Bolelli and Ivan Ljubičić Julien Benneteau and Nicolas Mahut won in the final 6–4, 7–6(8–6) against Arnaud Clément and Sébastien Grosjean.

Seeds

Draw

External links
 Main Draw

Grand Prix de Tennis de Lyon - Men's Doubles
Doubles